On 3 October 2012, three suicide car bombs exploded at the eastern corner of the Saadallah Al-Jabiri Square, killing 40 people. At least 122 people were reported injured. The bombs targeted an officers' club, nearby buildings of the Touristic Hotel, the historic "Jouha Café" and the Mirage Hotel near Bab Jnen. Both hotels and the surrounding buildings suffered extensive damage while the Jouha café was destroyed. A small building within the officers' club was also ruined.

See also
 List of bombings during the Syrian Civil War

References

Terrorist incidents in Aleppo during the Syrian civil war
Terrorist incidents in Syria in 2012
October 2012 events in Syria
Attacks on buildings and structures in Syria
Suicide car and truck bombings in Syria